Jinx is the fourth album by Quarashi, and is the only album the group released on a major record label. It was released on 9 April 2002. It was their first album to receive an international release, being released not only in Iceland, but also in the United States, Australia, Japan, and the rest of Europe. As such, Jinx is Quarashi's best known album.

History
After hearing Quarashi's last album, Xeneizes, EMI Music Resources contacted Quarashi to perform at the Iceland Airwaves Music Festival hosted by EMI in conjunction with Flugleiðir in New York City in the fall of 1999. The group performed two shows to rave reviews. The EMI emissary met with Quarashi, and the group went into a studio (which Sölvi has called a "crack house") to record six songs (four with vocals), with the EMI emissary watching them. In February 2000, Quarashi began negotiations with record labels, wrote some new songs, and performed shows for record executives. On 27 April 2000 it was announced that Quarashi had signed a deal with EMI Music Resources, a deal which gave the group creative control. Soon after, they were signed to independent record label, Time Bomb Recordings.

On 31 August 2000, it was announced that Quarashi had signed a deal with Sony Music Entertainment Incorporated under the Columbia Records label. The deal was to last for six albums, the first of which would be produced in collaboration with Cypress Hill DJ, DJ Muggs, and Brendan O' Brien, who was the recording director for the Red Hot Chili Peppers breakthrough hit album, Blood Sugar Sex Magik, and helped produced three of Rage Against The Machine's hit albums, Evil Empire, The Battle of Los Angeles, and Renegades.

Quarashi moved to New York City to begin making their American debut album. Jinx ended up being a collection of 5 new songs ("Mr. Jinx", "Baseline", "Malone Lives", "Copycat", and "Weirdo") and 7 songs from Xeneizes ("Stick 'Em Up", "Tarfur", "Jivin' About", "Xeneizes", "Fuck You Puto", "Dive In" and "Bless"). "Stick 'Em Up", "Tarfur", "Jivin' About", "Xeneizes", and "Fuck You Puto" were rerecorded  with "Jivin' About" being retitled "Transparent Parents". Only "Dive In" and "Bless" remained unchanged. Sölvi Blöndal has said that Jinx can be considered a "Best Of" album for Quarashi with 5 new songs.

Although there were now three rappers in Quarashi, there wasn't any song on the album that featured all three emcees. Instead, Hössi Olafsson rapped the most on Jinx (and sang on "Dive In"). Omar Swarez rapped several verses on "Stick 'Em Up" and "Weirdo", and rapped a verse on "Baseline", "Copycat", and "Fuck You Puto". Omar sang the chorus to "Malone Lives" and also did backup vocals for "Mr. Jinx" and "Transparent Parents". Steini a.k.a. Stoney rapped a verse on "Tarfur", "Transparent Parents" (where he sang the chorus), and "Xeneizes". 
Stoney also did backup vocals for "Stick 'Em Up", "Mr. Jinx", "Baseline", and "Fuck You Puto". Both Stoney and Omar played hype man for all the songs on the album except for "Dive In" and "Bless".                 
           
The Japanese release features two bonus tracks: "Into Your Arms", and "Switchstance", the title track from the band's debut EP.

The song "Tarfur", is in Icelandic and was an issue for the record. Quarashi didn't want to be considered just another rap/rock/nu metal band, so they recorded the track "Tarfur" in their native tongue. Their record label didn't like the track and didn't want it to be on the album, but the band successfully fought to have it included.

"Stick 'Em Up" was included in ATV Offroad Fury 2 for the PlayStation 2, the opening to NFL Blitz 20-03, and the trailer for 2 Fast 2 Furious.

"Mr. Jinx" appeared in Madden NFL 2003 from EA Sports in 2002, "Tarfur" appeared in the Xbox game Transworld Snowboarding in 2002, and "Baseline" appeared in the PS2 game Amplitude from Harmonix in 2003.

The instrumental version of "Stick 'Em Up" was heard on an ITV commercial which aired in late 2006.

The beginning of "Copycat" played during the Smirnoff Ice advertisements featuring Uri (played by Quarashi member Ómar Swarez) and his friend Gorb which aired from 2005–2006.

"Dive In" was covered by Icelandic group Singapore Sling and released as the opening track on the band's 2015 album Psych Fuck.

Track listing

"Stick 'Em Up"
"Mr. Jinx"
"Baseline"
"Malone Lives"
"Tarfur"
"Copycat"
"Transparent Parents"
"Weirdo"
"Xeneizes"
"Fuck You Puto"
"Dive In"
"Bless"
"Into Your Arms" (Japanese release only)
"Switchstance" (Japanese release only)

References 

2002 albums
Quarashi albums
Albums produced by Brendan O'Brien (record producer)